The following outline is provided as an overview of and topical guide to Catalonia:

Catalonia – nationality and autonomous community of Spain, located on the northeastern corner of the Iberian Peninsula. Its capital and largest city is Barcelona. With 7,7 million inhabitants, it is the second most populous Spanish autonomous community, as well a major industrial and touristic powerhouse.

Once a polity within the Crown of Aragon known as the Principality of Catalonia, it was integrated in to the Monarchy of Spain at the beginning of the 16th century. It lost its laws and institutions in 1714, after Bourbon victory on the War of the Spanish Succession. Throughout the nineteenth century, it became a industrial center while workers' movements and Catalan nationalism appeared. The Second Spanish Republic (1931-1939) granted it self-government, defending the Republican cause during the Spanish Civil War (1936-1939). The dictatorship of Francisco Franco abolished autonomy and repressed liberties and Catalan culture and language. After his death and the subsequent transition to democracy (1975-1981), self-government was restored.

General reference 

 Pronunciation:

 or 

 Common English country name(s): Catalonia
 Official English country name(s): Catalonia
 Common endonym(s): Catalunya (ca), Cataluña (es)
 Official endonym(s): Catalunya (ca), Catalonha (oc), Cataluña (es),
 Adjectival(s): Catalan
 Demonym(s): Catalan
 Etymology of Catalonia
 ISO region code: CT
 Internet generic (cultural) top-level domain: .cat
 International direct dialing uses the prefix +34 (Spain). Local codes are 93- (for Barcelona) and 97- (rest of Catalonia [Girona, Lleida, Tarragona]) for fixed landlines, and 6 (Spain) for mobile cellphones

Geography of Catalonia 

Geography of Catalonia

 Catalonia is...
 an autonomous community of Spain with the status of "nationality"
 Location:
 Northern Hemisphere, on the Prime meridian
 Eurasia
 Europe
 Southern Europe and Western Europe
 Iberian Peninsula
 Spain
 Time zone: Central European Time (UTC+01), Central European Summer Time (UTC+02)
 Extreme points of Catalonia:
 North: Tuc de Sacauba, Val d'Aran 
 South: Alcanar, Montsià 
 East:  Cap de Creus, Alt Empordà 
 West:  Tossal del Rei, Montsià 
 High:  Pica d'Estats, Pallars Sobirà at  
 Low:   Mediterranean coast at 
 Land boundaries:
 
  (France)
  (Spain)
  (Spain)
 Coastline:  580 km (Mediterranean Sea)
 Population of Catalonia: 7,565,603 (2012)
 Area of Catalonia: 32,114 km²
 Atlas of Catalonia

Environment of Catalonia 

 Climate of Catalonia
Mediterranean (Csa)
Continental Mediterranean (Csa) and Dry Mediterranean (Bsk)
Maritime (Cfb)
 Alpine (ET/H)

Natural geographic features of Catalonia 

 Mountains of Catalonia
 Rivers of Catalonia

Regions of Catalonia

Administrative divisions of Catalonia 

Administrative divisions of Catalonia
 Provinces of Catalonia (4)
 Àmbits funcionals territorials of Catalonia (8)
 Comarques of Catalonia (42)
 Municipalities of Catalonia (947)

Provinces of Catalonia 
 Barcelona
 Girona
 Lleida
 Tarragona

Àmbits funcionals territorials 
 Alt Pirineu i Aran
 Àmbit Metropolità de Barcelona
 Camp de Tarragona
 Comarques Centrals
 Comarques Gironines
 Penedès
 Ponent
 Terres de l'Ebre

Comarques of Catalonia

Municipalities of Catalonia 
Municipalities of Catalonia (947)
 Capital of Catalonia: Barcelona – also the largest city
 List of metropolitan areas in Catalonia
 Barcelona metropolitan area
 Tarragona metropolitan area

Demography of Catalonia 
Most populous municipalities :
 Barcelona 1,605,602
 L'Hospitalet de Llobregat 248,150
 Badalona 221,520
 Sabadell 200,545
 Terrassa 199,817
 Tarragona 131,158
 Lleida 125,677
 Santa Coloma de Gramenet 119,056
 Mataró 118,748
 Reus 101,767

Government and politics of Catalonia 

Politics of Catalonia

 Form of government: Autonomous entity (devolved government), in a parliamentary constitutional monarchy
 Institution of self-government: Generalitat of Catalonia (Generalitat de Catalunya)
 Capital: Barcelona
 Elections in Catalonia
 2021 Catalan parliamentary election
Political parties in Catalonia
Major parties:
 Esquerra Republicana de Catalunya (Republican Left of Catalonia) — ruling political party
 Partit dels Socialistes de Catalunya (Socialist Party of Catalonia)
 Junts per Catalunya (Together for Catalonia)
 Vox
 Candidatura d'Unitat Popular (Popular Unity Candidacy)
 Catalunya en Comú (Catalonia in Common)
 Ciutadans-Ciudadanos (Citizens)
 Partit Popular Català (People's Party of Catalonia)
 Queries on Catalonia independence
 Catalan independence referendum, 2017
 Institutional support for the queries on the independence of Catalonia

Branches of the government of Catalonia

Executive branch 
 Government of Catalonia (Govern de Catalunya)
 President of Catalonia (President de la Generalitat de Catalunya): Pere Aragonès
 Cabinet (Catalonia Government 2021- term of office).
 Minister of the Presidency (Consellera de la Presidència): Laura Vilagrà
 Minister of Climate Action, Food and Rural Agenda (Consellera d'Acció Climàtica, Alimentació i Agenda Rural): Teresa Jordà
 Minister of Culture (Consellera de Cultura): Natàlia Garriga
 Minister of Economy (Consellera d'Economia): Natàlia Mas
 Minister of Education (Conseller d'Educació): Josep González
 Minister of Universities and Research (Conseller d'Universitats i Recerca): Joaquim Nadal
 Minister of Digital Policies and Public Administration (Conseller de Polítiques Digitals i Administració Pública): Juli Fernàndez
 Minister of Foreign Action and Transparency (Consellera d'Accio Exterior i Transparència): Meritxell Serret
 Minister of Health (Conseller de Salut): Manel Balcells
 Minister of Home Affairs (Conseller d'Interior): Joan Ignasi Elena
 Minister of Justice (Consellera de Justícia): Gemma Ubasart
 Minister of Social Rights (Conseller de Drets Socials): Carles Campuzano
 Minister of Enterprise and Work (Conseller d'Empresa i Treball): Roger Torrent
 Minister of Equality and Feminisms (Consellera d'Igualtat i Feminismes): Tània Verge
 Secretary of the Government (Secretari del Govern): Xavier Bernadí
 Government Spokesperson (Portaveu del Govern): Patrícia Plaja
 Council of Statutarian Pledges (Consell de Garanties Estatutàries)
 Ombudsman (Síndic de Greuges): Esther Giménez-Salinas
 Syndicate of Accounts (Sindicatura de Comptes)
 Audiovisual Council of Catalonia (Consell de l'Audiovisual de Catalunya)

Legislative branch 
 Parliament of Catalonia (Parlament de Catalunya)
 Acting President of the Parliament of Catalonia (President del Parlament de Catalunya): Alba Vergés

Judicial branch 
 High Court of Justice of Catalonia (Tribunal Superior de Justícia de Catalunya, TSJC)

Law and order in Catalonia 

Law of Catalonia
 Statute of Autonomy of Catalonia
 Statute of Autonomy of Catalonia of 1932
 Statute of Autonomy of Catalonia of 1979
 2006 Catalan constitutional referendum
 Civil Code of Catalonia
 Capital punishment in Catalonia
 Criminal justice system of Catalonia
 Crime in Catalonia
 Organized crime in Catalonia
 Prostitution in Catalonia
 Human rights in Catalonia
 Freedom of the press in Catalonia
 Freedom of religion in Catalonia
 LGBT rights in Catalonia
 Law enforcement in Catalonia
 Mossos d'Esquadra (Police force of Catalonia)
 Penal system of Catalonia

Local government in Catalonia 

Local government of Catalonia

History of Catalonia 

History of Catalonia
 Timeline of Catalan history
 County of Barcelona
 Principality of Catalonia
 Catalan Republic
 Revolutionary Catalonia
 Economic history of Catalonia
 Military history of Catalonia
 Political history of Catalonia
 History of telephone service in Catalonia
 Current events of Catalonia

Culture of Catalonia 

Culture of Catalonia
 Architecture of Catalonia
 Cuisine of Catalonia
 Festivals in Catalonia
 Humour in Catalonia
 Media in Catalonia
 National symbols of Catalonia
 Coat of arms of Catalonia
 Flag of Catalonia
 National anthem of Catalonia
 Public holidays in Catalonia
 National Day of Catalonia
 Saint George's Day
 Religion in Catalonia
 Traditions of Catalonia
 Records of Catalonia
 World Heritage Sites in Catalonia
 Museums in Catalonia
 Libraries in Catalonia — Library of Catalonia
 Catalan Association for the Blind and Visually Impaired

The arts in Catalonia 

Catalan art
 Cinema of Catalonia
 Catalan comedy
 Literature of Catalonia
 Music of Catalonia
 Television in Catalonia
 Theatre in Catalonia

Languages of Catalonia 

Languages in Catalonia

 Official languages:
 Catalan language
 Aranese dialect of Gascon (Occitan language)
 Spanish language

People of Catalonia 
Ethno-linguistic groups of Catalonia:
 Catalan people
 Occitan people
 Spanish people
 Ethnic minorities in Catalonia

Sports in Catalonia 

Sport in Catalonia
 Football in Catalonia — Catalonia national football team
 Barça
 RCD Espanyol
 Girona FC
 Basketball in Catalonia
 Rugby in Catalonia
 Hockey in Catalonia

Economy and infrastructure of Catalonia 

Economy of Catalonia
 Four Motors for Europe
 List of Spanish autonomous communities by GRP
 Currency of Spain (thence Catalonia): Euro (sign: €; code: EUR)
 Transport in Catalonia
 Rail transport in Catalonia
 List of primary highways in Catalonia
 List of airports in Catalonia

Education in Catalonia 

Education in Catalonia
 High education in Catalonia
 List of universities of Catalonia
 List of colleges of Catalonia

See also 

Catalonia

 List of Catalonia-related topics
 List of international rankings
 Outline of geography
 Outline of Europe

References

External links 

Profiles
by the BBC News
by the Encyclopædia Britannica
by the Economist

Government
Generalitat de Catalunya
Presidency of Catalonia
Parliament of Catalonia
Government of Catalonia
Ministry for Foreign Action and Open Government
Office of Accounts

Public institutions
Catalan Tourist Board
Statistical Institute of Catalonia
Television of Catalonia
Rodalies de Catalunya
Ferrocarrils de la Generalitat de Catalunya
National Archive of Catalonia  
Institute of Catalan Studies
Catalan Natural Parks

Catalonia
Catalonia
 
Catalonia-related lists